Herberts Baumanis (born 5 January 1889, date of death unknown) was a Latvian sprinter. He competed in the men's 200 metres at the 1912 Summer Olympics representing the Russian Empire.

References

1889 births
Year of death missing
Athletes (track and field) at the 1912 Summer Olympics
Latvian male sprinters
Olympic competitors for the Russian Empire
Athletes from Riga